The 1931 SMU Mustangs football team represented Southern Methodist University (SMU) as a member the Southwest Conference (SWC) during the 1931  college football season. Led by 12th head coach Ray Morrison, the Mustangs compiled and overall record of 9–1–1 overall with a mark of 5–0–1 in conference play, and finished as SWC champion.

Schedule

References

SMU
SMU Mustangs football seasons
Southwest Conference football champion seasons
SMU Mustangs football